The following is a list of Oklahoma Sooners softball seasons. The Oklahoma Sooners softball program is a college softball team that represents the University of Oklahoma in the Big 12 Conference of the National Collegiate Athletic Association. The Sooners have won six Women's College World Series championships, fourteen Big 12 regular-season championships and seven Big 12 Conference Tournament championships.

References

UCLA
Oklahoma Sooners softball seasons